Metalloproteinase inhibitor 4 is an enzyme that in humans is encoded by the TIMP4 gene.

This gene belongs to the tissue inhibitor of metalloproteinases gene family. The proteins encoded by this gene family are inhibitors of the matrix metalloproteinases, a group of peptidases involved in degradation of the extracellular matrix. The secreted, netrin domain-containing protein encoded by this gene is involved in regulation of platelet aggregation and recruitment and may play role in hormonal regulation and endometrial tissue remodeling.

Interactions
TIMP4 has been shown to interact with MMP2.

See also
 TIMP1, TIMP2, TIMP3

References

Further reading

External links
 The MEROPS online database for peptidases and their inhibitors: I35.004